Edu Chaves Airport  is the airport serving Guaratinguetá, Brazil.

The airport is named after Eduardo Pacheco e Chaves (1887–1975), who was the first Brazilian pilot to fly in Brazil on March 8, 1912 in Santos. He also founded the first school of aviation in Brazil.

It is operated by Rede Voa.

Some of its facilities are used by the School of Aeronautics Specialists of the Brazilian Air Force.

History
On February 19, 2020 the administration of the airport was handed over to DAESP.

On July 15, 2021 the concession of the airport was auctioned to Rede Voa, under the name Consórcio Voa NW e Voa SE. The airport was previously operated by DAESP.

Airlines and destinations
No scheduled flights operate at this airport.

Access

See also
List of airports in Brazil

References

External links

Airports in São Paulo (state)
Airports established in 1940